Desmond James Murphy (6 July 1896 – 30 January 1982) was an Irish first-class cricketer.

Born at Armagh, Murphy was educated at Clongowes Wood College in County Kildare. Following World War I, Murphy attended University College Dublin, where he played club cricket for the university cricket team. He later played for Pembroke Cricket Club, and made one appearance in first-class cricket for Ireland against Scotland at Edinburgh in 1920. Batting twice during the match, Murphy was dismissed in Ireland's first-innings without scoring by Arthur Sellers, while in their second-innings he was dismissed for the same score by Gerard Crole. He bowled thirteen overs of his leg break googly, but went wicket-less. He later became the headmaster of St Gerard's School, Bray. He died at Cabinteely in January 1982.

References

External links

1896 births
1982 deaths
People from Armagh (city)
People educated at Clongowes Wood College
Alumni of University College Dublin
Cricketers from Northern Ireland
Irish cricketers
Irish educators